We Can! – Political Platform is a left-wing, green political party in Croatia formed by local green and leftist movements and initiatives in order act on national level for European Parliament and parliament elections.

After the 2021 local elections in Zagreb, they became the largest political party in the Zagreb Assembly, winning 23 seats in total. Their mayoral candidate Tomislav Tomašević won a landslide victory on 31 May.

History 
The party originated first as the initiative committee consisting of activists and left-wing politicians, 26 of them, mostly coming from the Zagreb is OURS! party, but also including other independent movements across the country within the same political and ideological spectrum.

Founding 
The party was officially founded on 10 February 2019, prior to the elections for the European Parliament held that year, stating their primary areas of interest being better education, better health policies, social and gender equality, support for migrants, renewable sources of energy, and sustainable agriculture.

The founding assembly defined that the party does not have an official president, but instead has two coordinators – from among the membership Sandra Benčić and Teodor Celakoski were elected – who along with another five members of the party make up its Party Board. Other prominent members of the Initiative committee at the time, most of whom remain active, included Danijela Dolenec, Damir Bakić, Iskra Mandarić, Đuro Capor, Urša Raukar, Vilim Matula, Dario Juričan, Mima Simić, Ivo Špigel, Tomislav Tomašević and others.

2019 EU elections 
The parties We can!, New Left, and Sustainable Development of Croatia formed a coalition on 28 March 2019 for the 2019 European Parliament election, where they were expected to win one seat. They also stated their support for the Green New Deal that is advocated by the Democracy in Europe Movement 2025 (DiEM25), and were subsequently supported by Yanis Varoufakis. In the end, the Možemo-led coalition received 1.79% of the popular vote and 19,313 votes in total.

2020 parliamentary elections 

Former SDP member and later independent parliamentarian Bojan Glavašević joined the coalition for the 2020 parliamentary elections as the first independent candidate. Mile Kekin, the frontman of the punk rock band Hladno pivo and his wife joined the party during this period, and he later authored the song that was used for the party campaigns. Jane Fonda also expressed support for them in the election. During this election, their popularity in Zagreb rose up.

According to the results, the coalition won around 7% of votes and 7 seats in the parliament. These seats were taken by Tomislav Tomašević, Sandra Benčić, Damir Bakić, Vilim Matula, Rada Borić, Katarina Peović, and Bojan Glavašević. In Dubrovnik, they managed to win 9% of the popular vote.

2021 Zagreb local elections 
In the Zagreb elections they managed to win 40% of the popular vote and 23 seats in the City Assembly.

Party program 
The party designates itself as "a wide and progressive new political platform that aims to gather voters ranging from radical left, through green, to social democracy". The developmental models proposed models seek to reduce precarious forms of work, strengthen economic democracy, and to foster trade unions, as well as the legal rights of workers in general.

Electoral performance

Parliament of Croatia

European Parliament

Zagreb Assembly

See also 
Green–Left Coalition
Zagreb je NAŠ!
We Must (Serbia)
Green Humane City (North Macedonia)

References 

Political parties established in 2019
2019 establishments in Croatia
Anti-fascism in Croatia
Anti-fascist organizations
Ecosocialist parties
Green political parties in Croatia
Left-wing parties
Political parties in Croatia
Progressive parties
Socialist parties in Croatia
Pro-European political parties in Croatia